The Ryukyu tip-nosed frog, Ryukyu Island frog, or Okinawa tip-nosed frog (Odorrana narina) is a species of frog in the family Ranidae. It is endemic to Okinawa Island, in the Ryukyu Islands of Japan.

It is threatened by habitat loss and by predation from introduced small Indian mongooses (Herpestes auropunctatus).

References

Odorrana
Endemic amphibians of Japan
Endemic fauna of the Ryukyu Islands
Endangered fauna of Asia
Amphibians described in 1901
Taxa named by Leonhard Stejneger
Taxonomy articles created by Polbot